The Men's team sprint competition at the 2020 World Single Distances Speed Skating Championships was held on February 13, 2020.

Results
The race was started at 15:40.

References

Men's team sprint